Laszlo Bellak (February 12, 1911 – September 20, 2006) was a Hungarian and American table tennis player.

Table tennis career
He represented Hungary 59 times in international competition. He won 21 medals at the World Championships, seven of which were gold. This included six wins as a member of the Hungarian National Team that won the Swaythling Cup in 1928, 1930, 1931, 1934, 1935, and 1938.

Bellak moved to the United States at the start of World War II, and enlisted in the U.S. Army, serving in India and Burma. He was decorated three times, and was honorably discharged with the Victory Medal, attaining the rank of Sergeant.

He won the U.S. Men’s Singles title in 1938, the U.S. Men’s Doubles in 1937, 1939, and 1943, and the U.S. Mixed Doubles in 1941. He also won three English Open titles.

Halls of Fame
Bellak was inducted into the USA Table Tennis Hall of Fame in 1980 and the International Table Tennis Foundation Hall of Fame in 1993.

Bellak, who was Jewish, was inducted into the International Jewish Sports Hall of Fame in 1995.

He was inducted into the Florida Table Tennis Hall of Fame in 1996.

Book
He authored Table Tennis—How A New Sport Was Born: The History of the Hungarian Team Winning 73 Gold Medals (1990).

See also
List of select Jewish table tennis players

References

External links
Jews in Sports bio

Table tennis players from Budapest
Hungarian male table tennis players
American male table tennis players
1911 births
2006 deaths
Hungarian Jews
Hungarian emigrants to the United States
American people of Hungarian-Jewish descent
Jewish table tennis players